St. John's Cathedral High School was a Roman Catholic high school in Milwaukee, Wisconsin associated with the Cathedral of St. John the Evangelist which operated from 1842, when it was founded as a school for boys (in the basement of the church at what is now the northwest corner of Jackson and State Streets) to 1976. When it closed due to financial problems and declining enrollment, it was the oldest Catholic high school in Milwaukee.

References 

Educational institutions established in 1842
Educational institutions disestablished in 1976
High schools in Milwaukee
Defunct schools in Wisconsin